Guillaume Van Tongerloo (29 December 1933 – 19 January 2017) was a Belgian cyclist. He competed in the team pursuit event at the 1956 Summer Olympics.

References

External links
 

1933 births
2017 deaths
Belgian male cyclists
Olympic cyclists of Belgium
Cyclists at the 1956 Summer Olympics
Cyclists from Antwerp